The Marche regional election of 2005 took place on 3–4 April 2005.

Gian Mario Spacca (The Daisy, then Democratic Party) defeated Francesco Massi (Union of Christian and Centre Democrats, at the time, now member of The People of Freedom) by a landslide.

Results
Source: Ministry of the Interior

Elections in Marche
2005 elections in Italy